Cantharidus pallidulus is a species of sea snail, a marine gastropod mollusk in the family Trochidae, the top snails.

Description
The imperforate shell has an elevated conical shape. The ribs are transversely elevated with golden yellow colors. The columella is almost straight and somewhat swollen in the middle. The lip shows some ridges within.

Distribution
This marine species is endemic to Australia.

References

pallidulus
Gastropods of Australia
Gastropods described in 1851